The Praga Alfa was the name used by Praga in Czechoslovakia for one of its principal car ranges. Production started in 1913 and finished in 1942.

Overview
The Alfa was initially conceived as a cheaper and smaller complement to the Praga Grand and Mignon. The car was first produced in 1913 as a "people's car" for the mass market, combining affordability with reasonable levels of comfort and practicality. The design, developed under the leadership of Frantisek Kec, was traditional, combining a backbone frame with all-independent suspension and a side valve engine. Sales were successful, with all the vehicles produced in the first year sold within the year. Production was halted due to the mobilisation that led up to World War I but resumed in 1923. In September 1927, an Alfa with a larger 6 cylinder engine was introduced, followed by a completely new model in October 1937.

A total of 9257 vehicles were produced.

Alfa 5/15HP 

The first Alfa was launched in 1913. The design was traditional with a front-mounted engine driving the rear wheels through a four speed manual transmission. Each cylinder had two side valves. Production lasted one year before mobilisation for the First World War halted activity on civilian cars.

After the war, Praga found itself in a new country, Czechoslovakia, and a new economic reality, with imports of critical components like tyres proving expensive. Although the company had survived the war, production focused on vehicles like plows and roadrollers rather than cars. Production of the Alfa resumed in 1923, with the design unchanged. The cost of a car at the factory gate was 50,000 CSK. The car was slightly improved in 1925, with the addition of brakes to the front wheels and a statuette of a runner holding a laurel wreath in outstretched arms mounted on a new nickel-plated radiator.

Alfa 8/25HP 

1927 saw the first radical redesign of the Alfa. The new car was a "small six", a car for the popular market powered by a 6-cylinder engine. Introduced in September 1927, the Alfa 8/25HP was a more powerful development of the pre-war Alfa. The car introduced a  water-cooled 6-cylinder engine with a removable head incorporating Ricardo combustion units. It was the smallest 6-cylinder engine produced in Czechoslovakia at the time. It had rigid axles, drum brakes and a front-mounted  fuel tank. Cost of the car was 64,000 CSK. 2500 cars were produced between 1927 and 1929.

References

Citations

Bibliography

 
 
 
 

Cars introduced in 1913
Cars of the Czech Republic
Praga vehicles